Varvarino is a rural locality (a settlement) in Novokhopyorsk, Novokhopyorsky District, Voronezh Oblast, Russia. The population was 165 as of 2010.

Geography 
Varvarino is located 19 km northeast of Novokhopyorsk (the district's administrative centre) by road. Alfyorovka is the nearest rural locality.

References 

Populated places in Novokhopyorsky District